Terodiline is a drug used in urology as an antispasmodic.

It relaxes the smooth muscle and used to reduce bladder tone in treatment of urinary frequency and incontinence. Muscle relaxation caused by terodiline, is probably due to its anticholinergic and calcium antagonist activity.

However, it also blocks IKr (Kv11.1) channels (see hERG gene) so can pose a risk for torsades de pointes. This cardiotoxicity is concentration dependent.

References

Amines
Muscarinic antagonists
Tert-butyl compounds